Dante Boon (born 1973) is a Dutch composer and pianist. A member of the Wandelweiser composers collective, he is perhaps best known as an interpreter of experimental piano music. His own music has been performed internationally to wide acclaim.

Biography
Dante Boon started his piano studies at age 14, with Willem Brons at the Sweelinck Conservatorium in Amsterdam. He studied composition with Diderik Wagenaar at the Royal Conservatory in The Hague. At the age of 24, he joined the Dutch rock band The Scene as a keyboardist and arranger.

A champion of experimental piano music and of Wandelweiser in particular, Boon has premiered over 70 works, many of which written specifically for him. He has performed at such venues as Constellation Chicago, Spectrum, Studio Z, Jeunesses Musicales du Canada, the ISCM Festival, cafe OTO, dotolim, Ftarri Festival, Musica Sacra Maastricht, Gaudeamus Muziekweek, De Link, Paradiso, and regularly at Amsterdam's underground venue Zaal 100 and Klangraum in Düsseldorf.

Boon has also been active as a concert organizer himself. He was one of the young composers who organized the Amsterdam concert series for new music Concerten Tot en Met between 1997 and 2004. He has also co-organized the series The Workshop/Maximum Clarity (with James Fulkerson) at Zaal 100, and since 2007 (with Stevko Busch) Pianolab Amsterdam, a showcase for Amsterdam pianists and their guests, at the Goethe-Institut. In 2017, Boon organized the Amsterdam Wandelweiser Festival, a four-day festival of Wandelweiser music.

He has recorded music by composers such as Tom Johnson, Philip Corner, Rozalie Hirs, John Cage, Jürg Frey, Antoine Beuger, Samuel Vriezen, Morton Feldman, Richard Ayres and Michael Manion. With pianist-composer Samuel Vriezen, he recorded Tom Johnson's Symmetries for piano four hands. In 2004, he premiered Johnson's Same or Different, commissioned by VPRO Radio.

Boon's compositions have been performed internationally, at such venues as Museo Reina Sofía, Goethe-Institut Amsterdam, Kunstraum, Alte Jazz-Schmiede, Old Stone House (Brooklyn), Willow Place Auditorium, Orgelpark, Stedelijk Museum, V2  Institute for the Unstable Media, Muziekgebouw aan 't IJ, the Royal Academy of Dutch language and literature,  Huddersfield Contemporary Music Festival, The Wild Beast, Kultur & Kongresshaus Aarau, UCSB, and REDCAT. Performers of his music have included Ensemble Sisyphe, the Barton Workshop, the Wandelweiser Composers Ensemble, The Same Ensemble, Diana Plays Perception, de ereprijs, Nederlands Vocaal Laboratorium, Ensamble NEO, Antoine Beuger, Jürg Frey, Michael Pisaro, Stefan Thut, Samuel Vriezen, Germaine Sijstermans, Taylan Susam, Irene Kurka, Erik Carlson, Denis Sorokin and Sergej Tchirkov. His scores are published by Edition Wandelweiser.

He is also known as a skillful arranger, having arranged music for The Scene and Wende, among others.

Since 2016, he has taken up conducting. In November of that year, he conducted Ensemble Sisyphe in a program of music by André Cormier, Tom Johnson, Taylan Susam, and himself.

He was a guest lecturer at the 13th  hosted by the University of Music and Performing Arts Vienna. A three-concert musical portrait of Dante Boon was presented in 2012 at Düsseldorf's Klangraum.  In 2013, he was a special guest at Michael Pisaro's Dog Star Orchestra festival of experimental music. In the same year, a retrospective of Boon's music was presented at the Los Angeles performance space the wulf. In 2016, Boon was featured as a composer and performer at Quatuor Bozzini's Performer's Kitchen.

He is married to Dutch actress Sytske van der Ster.

Musical works
John Eyles, writing for All About Jazz, has described Boon's works as "exquisite throughout, without a single wasted note or gesture to be heard." His CD clarinet (and piano), which features clarinetist Jürg Frey, was recommended by The New Yorkers Alex Ross and by Andy Hamilton in The Wires Top 10 albums of contemporary music.

Many of Boon's works are composed so as to give players room to discover their own way through the piece. His clarinet piece 3x, for example, consists of three staves of music containing pitches in three respective registers among which the clarinetist is free to move. In a program note, Michael Pisaro describes Boon's piano piece 14x as follows:
Although the piece is quite slow, and is seemingly a simple series of sustained chords with an occasional beautiful melodic gesture, the technique employed is actually very challenging. No pedal is used, therefore, in order maintain the mostly 10-note sounds all fingers of both hands are employed, holding down keys for the whole piece. What at first seems nearly impossible reveals itself to be ingeniously composed to be just possible.

In a review of Boon's 2 Delen (after Sam Sfirri), Paul Muller writes the following: 
[A] subtle work featuring electric guitar and voice. The guitar plays a slow ascending scale and at certain points the voice joins. The pure pitches made for some beautiful sounds and overtones. When the voice and guitar met in unison a new cycle would start.

His vocal piece Mirte, a setting of the first three stanzas of Antoine Beuger's translation of the Spiritual Canticle by John of the Cross, has been described as an "inward psychological turn of a voice trying to sing to itself."

Boon as a pianist
Dante Boon has been called a "magnificent" and "idiosyncratic" pianist, known for his "delicate touch" and "calm control." His performances of Komitas's piano music have been called "quieting" and "the highlight [of the concert]". Jay Batzner, writing for Sequenza21, describes Boon's recordings of Tom Johnson's music as "a delight to listen to." The New Yorker called him a pianist with an "uncommon affinity for music that demands patience, steady hands, and a subtle touch." National Sawdust's Steve Smith listed one of Boon's 2018 solo recitals in New York in his top 10 of memorable musical events.

Boon's debut album as a soloist, cage.frey.vriezen.feldman.ayres.johnson manion, was met with critical acclaim. Anthony Fiumara, writing for Trouw, notes that "[i]t is striking how self-evident [John Cage's] pointillist Etudes Australes sound under Boon's fingers," while characterizing Boon's playing as "murmurous lyricism." In a review for NRC Handelsblad, Jochem Valkenburg notes Boon's "warm, shrouded tone" and, singling out his interpretation of Morton Feldman's Last Pieces, calls it "objective yet affectionate…measured, pensive, yet vulnerable." Samuel Vriezen, writing in the liner notes to the album, similarly observes:
Two poles are important for Dante's playing. On the one hand he is drawn towards the musical discipline of the Cageian tradition and its concern with objectivity in sound. On the other hand, early Romanticism, particularly German song repertoire, is important to him. For many listeners, these poles may seem like opposites. For Dante, however, there is no contradiction. In his playing, precision of technique and conceptual clarity are expressions of a passionate engagement with sounds and their progression as melody.

His album with Jürg Frey, clarinet (and piano), containing Boon's own compositions, was similarly well received.

Selected works
Solo
 14x, piano (2007)
 Uitdrijving, voice and percussion (1 performer) (2009)
 3x, clarinet (2011)
 Nov. (piano), piano (2011)
 Glimmen, piano (2012)
 Years, numbers, piano (2012)
 Duo (2h), piano (2017)
 Duo (accordion), accordion (2017)
 Duo (guitar), (electric) guitar (2018)
 Dean's piano, piano (2018)
 before traces, piano (2019)
 C#, piano (2019)
 You just don't argue, piano (2019)
 Gaza (bassoon), bassoon (2019)
 For What, piano (2020)
 mansa / Van Daan, piano and/or violin (2020)
 Dreamings, piano (2021)
 Nov. (3), organ (2021)
 Album für die Jugend, toy piano (2023)

Duo
 sex (2), clarinet and cello (2006)
 Het sneeuwt      maar het sneeuwt niet meer (2009)
 Wolken/veld, clarinet and piano (2011)
 Lied (je slaapt), clarinet and (toy) piano (2012)
 2 Delen (after Sam Sfirri), 2 instruments (2012)
 2 Spelers (after Antoine Beuger), 2 instruments (2012)
 Nov. (violin), violin and piano (2013)
 3x (careful rests), guitar and piano (2014)
 O'Hare, clarinet and piano (2014)
 Duo (chorals), clarinet and trombone (2017)
 Duo (nocturne), guitar and cello (2017)
 Duo (trombone), trombone and piano (2018)
 Martha's Vineyard, glockenspiel and piano (2018)
 Gaza, 2 instruments (2018)
 Duo (stone harp), stone harp and melody instrument (2020)
 Duo: table & books, 2 performers (2020)
 Couple, piano four hands (2020)
 20/21, 2 instruments (2021)

Songs

 Ashbery (I Saw No Need), baritone (2003)
 2x Robert Creeley, soprano and piano (2009)
 Mirte, female voice and keyboard (1 performer) (2011)
 the heart's size, low (female) voice, piano (2011)
 Om zachtjes in jezelf te zeggen, voice (2012)
 And/or, voice (2012)
 ruht nicht aus, voice and instrument (2015)
 Depression (Herbeck), (female) voice and piano (2017)
 Duo (commonalities), 2 voices (2017)
 Ta na sitàt, voice and piano (2020)
 Alone, voice and piano (2021)

Ensemble
 sex, clarinet, violin, viola (2006)
 Nov., string quartet (2006)
 sex (3), 5 voices (2007)
 12x, 3 instruments (2011)
 17x, clarinet and 2 instruments (2011)
 Avellino, soprano and ensemble (2012)
 St Paul, ensemble (2014)
 Bacherach, voice, violin and piano (2014)
 3x (Antoine), flute, piano and ensemble (2015)
 Nov. (seven), ensemble (2016)
 Duo 1-5, ensemble (2017)
 Die Palmen von Beth-El, 4 performers (2018)
 the prayer's end, voice and ensemble (2015/2019)
 Nov. (three), clarinet, double bass and piano (2020)
 Nov. (koor), choir (SATB) (2021)
 Night / I Wrote a Good Omelet, three voices (STB) (2021)
 String quartet (2021)
 Sarabandes, 2 voices, 2 organs and ensemble (2022)

Selected discography
 Marlene, Mercury Records (1998) (with The Scene)
 1998, Pressure (1999) (with Thé Lau)
 Tom Johnson: Symmetries, Karnatic Lab Records (2006) (with Samuel Vriezen)
 cage.frey.vriezen.feldman.ayres.johnson manion, Edition Wandelweiser Records (2010)
 Jürg Frey: 24 Wörter, Edition Wandelweiser Records (2014) (with Regula Konrad & Andrew McIntosh)
 Dante Boon: clarinet (& piano), Another Timbre (2016) (with Jürg Frey)
 Jürg Frey: Collection Gustave Roud, Another Timbre (2017) (with Jürg Frey, Stefan Thut & Andrew McIntosh)
 Düsseldorf recital, Rhizome.s (2017)
 beuger.boon.susam, Edition Wandelweiser Records (2018)
 Antoine Beuger: traces of eternity: of what is yet to be, a new wave of jazz (2019)
 hannesson.boon.philippakopoulos, Edition Wandelweiser Records (2019)
 One Night in Forest Hills, Bánh Mì Verlag (2020)
 Jürg Frey: l'air, l'instant - deux pianos, Elsewhere (2020)
 amsterdam.berlin.moscow losoncy, Edition Wandelweiser Records (2021)
 Dante Boon: Duos, Edition Wandelweiser Records (2023)
 Jürg Frey: Three Piano Pieces (tba)
 Erik Satie: Vexations (tba)

References

External links
 

 Dante Boon at Edition Wandelweiser
 Interview with Dante Boon
 Profile of Dante Boon by Jesse Goin
Music
 
 
 
Dante Boon plays Morton Feldman's "Last Pieces" (Free Music Archive)

Dutch male classical composers
Dutch classical composers
Dutch classical pianists
Minimalist composers
Dutch experimental musicians
20th-century classical composers
21st-century classical composers
Composers for piano
1973 births
Living people
Composers for clarinet
Male classical pianists
21st-century classical pianists
20th-century Dutch male musicians
21st-century male musicians